In organic chemistry, phosphonites are organophosphorus compounds with the formula P(OR)2R. They are found in some pesticides and are used as ligands.

Preparation
Although they are derivatives of phosphonous acid (RP(OH)2), they are not prepared from such precursors.  Phosphonites are prepared by alcoholysis of organophosphinous chlorides. For example, treatment of dichlorophenylphosphine with methanol and base gives dimethyl phenylphosphonite:
Cl2PPh + 2 CH3OH → (CH3O)2PPh + 2 HCl

Reactions 
Oxidation of phosphonites gives phosphonates:
2 P(OR)2R + O2 → 2 OP(OR)2R

Phosphonites can function as ligands in homogeneous catalysis.

References 

Functional groups
Organophosphonites